Renato Bertelli (1900 in Lastra a Signa – 1974 in Florence) was an Italian Futurist artist.

His most, and perhaps only, noted work is the 1933 ceramic bust of Benito Mussolini in the aeroceramica style, Profilo continuo del Duce (also cited as Profilo contino del Duce).  The title is sometimes given as "Head of Mussolini" but is better known as "Head of Mussolini (Continuous Profile)", "Continuous profile of Mussolini", or "Continuous Profile – Head of Mussolini".  The sculpture is one block with the Mussolini's distinctive profile continuing around 360 degrees.

The sculpture was later mass produced in several versions, in bronzed terracotta, wood, and aluminium.
Mussolini, with his taste for self-commemoration, approved it as an official portrait.

References

Marco Moretti, Renato Bertelli, monografia critica,Masso delle Fate Edizioni, Signa, 2007, pp. 160.

External links
 The "Continuous Profile" at a ceramics exhibition at the Tate Liverpool
 "Profilo continuo del Duce", Wolfsonian Museum
 Images of "Profilo continuo del Duce" on the internet art auction site artnet
 Card advertising "Profilo continuo del Duce, opera dello scultore Bertelli ('work of sculptor Bertelli') "in various sizes and materials from an Italian Militaria website.

1900 births
1974 deaths
People from Lastra a Signa
Italian artists
Futurist artists